Bidhrohini is a 2020 Bengali action drama film directed and produced by Sandip Chowdhury. This film was released on 14 February 2020 under the banner of Mirage movies. This is the debut direction of Sandip Choodhury, son of director Anjan Choudhury.

Plot
Arunima, the daughter of Pranab and Radha of a middle-class family, live happily. One day Arunima was raped. Her elder sister Kiran is an IPS officer who fights alone for justice. She faced a serious problem while come to know that her husband's family is involved with the crime.

Cast
 Rituparna Sengupta as Kiran
 Jeetu Kamal as Rahul
 Bidisha Chowdhury
 Sonali Chowdhury
 Phalguni Mukherjee
 Anindo Sarkar
 Santana Basu
 Arunima Sen
 Soma Chakraborty
 Parthasarathi Deb

References

External links
 

2020 films
Bengali-language Indian films
Indian films about revenge
2020 action drama films
2020s Bengali-language films
Indian action drama films